David Pasin (born July 8, 1966) is a Canadian former professional ice hockey centre. He was drafted in the first round, 19th overall, by the Boston Bruins in the 1984 NHL Entry Draft.

Pasin played 76 games in the National Hockey League; 71 with the Bruins in the 1985–86 season and five with the Los Angeles Kings in the 1988–89 season.

Career statistics

Regular season and playoffs

Roller Hockey statistics
 --- Regular Season --- 
Season Team Lge GP G A Pts PIM 
-------------------------------------------------------
1996 Oakland Skates RHI 6 3 2 5 6
-------------------------------------------------------

Awards
 WHL East Second All-Star Team – 1984 & 1985

External links

1966 births
Living people
Bolzano HC players
Boston Bruins draft picks
Boston Bruins players
Canadian ice hockey centres
HC Davos players
HC Fribourg-Gottéron players
HC Thurgau players
Ice hockey people from Edmonton
Los Angeles Kings players
Maine Mariners players
Moncton Golden Flames players
National Hockey League first-round draft picks
New Haven Nighthawks players
Oakland Skates players
Phoenix Roadrunners (IHL) players
Prince Albert Raiders players
San Francisco Spiders players
Springfield Indians players
HC Gardena players
Canadian expatriate ice hockey players in Italy
Canadian expatriate ice hockey players in Switzerland